Teratorn Aircraft, Inc. (named for the extinct ice age soaring bird) was an American aircraft manufacturer based in Clear Lake, Iowa. The company specialized in the design and manufacture of ultralight aircraft in the form of kits for amateur construction and ready-to-fly aircraft under the US FAR 103 Ultralight Vehicles rules.

The company was formed as Motorized Gliders of Iowa, Inc. in 1976 and located in a  production facility. The company first produced the weight-shift Teratorn Aircraft Teratorn and the follow-up Teratorn T/A single seat ultralight motorglider designs. In 1983 it introduced the Tierra and Tierra II.

After Teratorn went out of business in about 1989, Golden Circle Air of De Soto, Iowa took up production of Terratorn's designs. Golden Circle Air went out of business in circa 2006, the designs were acquired by Indy Aircraft and put back into production in 2011.

Terratorn's Tierra and Tierra II designs have a reputation for structural strength and robustness in service; more than 4000 have been completed and flown.

Aircraft

References

External links

 
Defunct aircraft manufacturers of the United States
Ultralight aircraft
Homebuilt aircraft